The National Society for the Gifted and Talented (NSGT) is a Stamford, Connecticut based not-for-profit 501(c)(3) organization created to honor and encourage gifted and talented (G&T) children and youth. It is committed to acknowledging and supporting the needs of these children and youth by providing recognition of their significant academic and artistic accomplishments and access to educational resources and advanced learning opportunities directly related to their interests and talent areas.

The goal of the NSGT is to provide a structure where gifted and talented children and youth are identified, and as members, can expect to find information and opportunities that directly relate to, and cultivate, their abilities and desires to achieve at a high level.

NSGT collaborates closely with other gifted and talented program providers, school districts, colleges and universities, community programs, and corporations.

Board of trustees 
 Chair: Arie L. Nettles, Ph.D., NCSP, HSP - Associate Professor of Clinical Pediatrics, Center for Child Development, Vanderbilt University
 Vice Chair: Judith Parker, Ph.D. - Executive Director, Carmel Hill Fund Education Program
 Executive Director: Barbara Swicord Ed.D. - President and CEO, Summer Institute for the Gifted
 Treasurer: Jack Burg - Chief Financial Officer, American Institute For Foreign Study
 Benjamin Davenport - Principal, Eastern Middle School (retired), Riverside, CT 
 Rachael Dubin (Alumna, SIG) Product Manager, IBM - Doctoral Student, Drexel University College of Computing and Informatics
 Julia To Dutka, Ed.D. - Strategist, CGFNS International, Inc.
 William L. Gertz - President and CEO, American Institute For Foreign Study
 Matthew Greene. Ph.D. - Educational Director, Howard Greene and Associates
 Felice Kaufmann, Ph.D. - Educational Consultant
 Joseph Renzulli, Ed.D. - Director, National Research Center for the Gifted and Talented, University of Connecticut
 Leonard M. Robinson - Executive Director, New Jersey YMHA-YWHA Camps
 Sir Cyril Taylor, GBE - Chairman, American Institute For Foreign Study
 Abby Weisberg - Summer Institute for the Gifted Parent

External links
 National Society for the Gifted and Talented

Non-profit organizations based in Connecticut
Giftedness
Organizations based in Stamford, Connecticut
Companies based in Stamford, Connecticut